Cartoon violence is the representation of violent actions involving animated characters and situations. This may include violence where a character is unharmed after the action has been inflicted. Animated violence is sometimes partitioned into comedic and non-comedic cartoon violence.

Influence on real-life behavior
Opinions on the influences of cartoon violence vary. Some researchers believe that high level of violence in cartoons can make children more aggressive. Their studies also found that young children tend to mimic the negative behavior they see on television. In a year, a child watching an average of 2 hours of cartoons a day will have seen 10,000 violent acts. Studies have shown that watching more cartoon violence is associated with higher levels of aggression among Taiwanese children. Output aimed at children as young as seven, which include a number of cartoons, had the highest levels of violence. Researchers also concluded across the early and middle childhood, laboratory experiments using cartoons with comedic violence have consistently failed to demonstrate significant differences in person-oriented aggression. In contrast, field experiments have consistently shown that aggressive behavior towards peers increases following the viewing of non-comedic violent cartoons.

Other researchers believe that people need to consider the ways in which children process information, the amount of mental effort they invest, and their own life experience to gain an understanding of how television violence affects children. For instance, recent research has indicated that children do not appear to mimic acts of violence in the media, whether television or cartoons.

Blumberg, Bierwirth and Schwartz argue that children possess the ability to differentiate real life from animation, as well as the ability to understand right from wrong. They know that violent acts qualify as immoral and infringe on the welfare of others, therefore the violence witnessed in cartoons will register as "make believe" to children and will not be applied into their real lives. Children who were affected by harmful content are often excluded from the preceding discussions. Adults create idealized opinions for the general “child” instead of basing their beliefs over the feelings and experiences of a hurt child.

Options for parents and restriction
There are a number of ways parents can control their children’s exposure to violence. One of the most effective and common ways of prevention is restricting the number and types of programs children watch. With older children, parents might want to discuss, and explain television. This can help children to understand television material and overcome the effect TV violence has on their outlook and behaviors.

Three initiatives have been put in place to combat violence in cartoons. The first is The Children's Television Act which requires broadcasters to air shows which are educational and provide information for the children. The second initiative is the V-chip legislation that gives parents the opportunity to block out violent shows from their television. The third legislation against violent cartoons is the National Cable Television Association’s TV Parental Guidelines, which is a system that rates the Television shows based on their contents.

In action-adventure oriented cartoons, the most consistent avenue of addressing violence is the use of a form of fantasy violence in which no one is injured or killed on screen. In science fiction cartoons, for example, enemy forces are typically said to be robots so that they may be destroyed in bulk by the heroes without concern over killing living beings. In cases where vehicles are known to be piloted by living beings, tanks, aircraft, and other war vehicles that are destroyed in combat always allow time for the pilot to escape or bail out. Realistic firearms are often replaced with futuristic beam weapons which still seldom hit anyone. Swords and other bladed weapons may be prohibited from being used as offensive weapons but may be used defensively or be depicted as magical weapons. Guns are seen in 26% of violent incidents, specifically in cartoons based on real life. Direct violence is frequently limited to hand to hand combat where directly kicking or punching another character may or may not be allowed. The majority of action adventure cartoons over the past decades have used these methods of depicting dynamic action scenes although their use has been heavily criticized as "sanitized violence". This type of violence refers to when minimal to no physical harm is shown, as well as little attention is paid to the long-term effects. Despite studies demonstrating that this television category has the most violence, many individuals do not consider sanitized cartoons to be violent. Cartoons based on the Voltron, Transformers, G.I. Joe, and Masters of the Universe franchises (especially the versions produced during the 1980s) are notable examples using variations on fantasy violence.

Victor C. Strasburger, Amy B. Jordan and Ed Donnerstein, writing in Pediatrics, say that parents should limit the total screen time for children older than two years of age to no more than one to two hours per day. Children under two years of age should avoid watching television altogether. Televisions should be kept out of children’s bedrooms and parents should watch television with their children and discuss the content. Saturday morning cartoons are considered the most popular time for children to witness violence on television because cartoons have more violence than comedies and dramas.

Health practitioners can also play their part by taking the time to ask their young patients how much time per day they spend with entertainment media and if there is a television or computer with Internet access in their bedroom. Six or more hours of TV viewing is linked to mild to severe depression levels.

Effects

Effects of cartoon violence on youth remain controversial. Research has generally been divided on this issue with no consensus reached regarding the effects of violence on behavior. Huesmann 2007 claimed watching violent cartoons can make young children more aggressive. Steuer, Applefield and Smith claim children emulate cartoon characters' activities, even when they aren't depicted as being human. Bandura, Ross, and Ross 1963 point out that what might seem clearly fictional to an adult might seem real to young children. Blumberg, Bierwirth and Schwartz claim the impact of exposure to violence may remain regardless of whether children choose to imitate it.

References

Animation
Violence